Acacia ericifolia is a shrub belonging to the genus Acacia and the subgenus Phyllodineae endemic to Western Australia.

Description
It blooms from April to August and produces yellow flowers. The simple inflorescences are found singly or in pairs in the axils. The spherical flower-heads have a diameter of  containing 18 to 33 golden flowers.

Distribution
It is native to an area in the Mid West, Wheatbelt and Great Southern regions of Western Australia between Northampton in the north to Lake Grace in the south where it is found on sandplains and coastal cliffs, laterite hills and granite outcrops where it grows in skeletal sandy soils. It can be a part of heathland communities or in wandoo or marri woodland communities.

See also
List of Acacia species

References

ericifolia
Acacias of Western Australia
Taxa named by George Bentham
Plants described in 1842